Autumn Moon Entertainment is an independent computer game developer founded in 2002 by Bill Tiller.  The company specializes in traditional graphic adventure games in the style of the LucasArts classics, particularly The Curse of Monkey Island, on which Tiller served as the lead background artist.  The studio released A Vampyre Story in 2008 and Ghost Pirates of Vooju Island in 2009.

The studio's intended third release, A Vampyre Story 2: A Bat's Tale, is on indefinite hold due to financial issues with its publisher, Crimson Cow.  With the distribution rights to the sequel still held by the publisher, Autumn Moon launched a Kickstarter crowdfunding campaign for an episodic, independent prequel to the A Vampyre Story saga called A Vampyre Story: Year One, which was unsuccessful. However, the game remains in development.

Autumn Moon Entertainment will be licensing the Ghost Pirates of Vooju Island intellectual property to Bill Tiller's new company (which was co-founded by Gene Mocsy and Jeremiah Grant), Venture Moon Industries, for the spin-off Duke Grabowski: Mighty Swashbuckler!

Company strategy
Autumn Moon Entertainment is dedicated to creating original adventure games.  Their staff includes a number of former LucasArts employees, and as such, their games frequently reference LucasArts properties such as Monkey Island.

References

American companies established in 2002
Indie video game developers
Video game companies of the United States
Video game development companies
Companies based in Sonoma County, California
Video game companies established in 2002
2002 establishments in California
Privately held companies based in California
Petaluma, California